Meir Gabay (born July 3, 1989) is an Israeli footballer who plays as a center back for Liga Gimel club Hapoel Kiryat Yam.

External links
 

1989 births
Living people
Israeli footballers
Hapoel Haifa F.C. players
Maccabi Ironi Kiryat Ata F.C. players
Hapoel Nof HaGalil F.C. players
Hapoel Nir Ramat HaSharon F.C. players
Hapoel Ashkelon F.C. players
Hapoel Migdal HaEmek F.C. players
Ironi Tiberias F.C. players
Hapoel Kafr Kanna F.C. players
Ironi Nesher F.C. players
Hapoel Asi Gilboa F.C. players
Footballers from Kiryat Motzkin
Liga Leumit players
Israeli Premier League players
Association football defenders